Kamalan District is a district (bakhsh) in Aliabad County, Golestan Province, Iran. At the 2006 census, its population was 34,317, in 8,312 families.  The District has one city: Fazelabad.  The District has two rural districts (dehestan): Estarabad Rural District and Shirang Rural District.

References 

Districts of Golestan Province
Aliabad County